Georgi Tomov Valchev (born 7 March 1991) is a Bulgarian footballer who plays as a midfielder for Hebar Pazardzhik.

Career
Valchev previously played for Chavdar Etropole, Svetkavitsa, Lokomotiv Plovdiv, Neftochimic Burgas and Vereya.

In July 2018, he joined Botev Vratsa.

References

External links 
 
 

1991 births
Living people
Bulgarian footballers
FC Chavdar Etropole players
PFC Svetkavitsa players
Neftochimic Burgas players
FC Lyubimets players
PFC Lokomotiv Plovdiv players
FC Vereya players
FC Botev Vratsa players
PFC Slavia Sofia players
PFC Ludogorets Razgrad II players
First Professional Football League (Bulgaria) players
Second Professional Football League (Bulgaria) players
Association football midfielders
People from Sandanski
Sportspeople from Blagoevgrad Province